Fort Mohave is an unincorporated community and CDP in Mohave County, Arizona, United States. It is named for a nearby fort that was used during the Mohave War. As of the 2020 census, the population of Fort Mohave was 16,190, up from 14,364 in 2010 and 8,919 in 2000. It is a suburb of Bullhead City. Its recent growth has made it the most populous unincorporated community in Mohave County.

The largest single employer in Fort Mohave is Valley View Medical Center. In 2013, Fort Mohave became the home of a 200+ acre photovoltaic solar generating plant. The plant was built east of Vanderslice Road between Joy Lane and Lipan Boulevard.

History

The first known European to visit the area was Spanish explorer Melchor Díaz. He documented his travels in what is now northwestern Mohave County in 1540. He recounts meeting a large population of natives who referred to themselves as the Pipa Aha Macav, meaning "People by the River". From "Aha Macav" came the Spanish name "Mojave", which was later passed into English, where it is also spelled "Mohave". When most people refer to Fort Mohave, they use the spelling "Mohave", while the tribe retains the traditional Spanish spelling "Mojave".

During the Mohave War the fort was established as a base of U. S. Army military operations against the native Mohave people, who had been living in the area for centuries prior. In April 1861, during the early part of the American Civil War, the fort was abandoned, its garrison sent to secure Southern California from possible secession, and then sent to the east. It was subsequently garrisoned by Company B and Company I, 4th California Infantry Regiment, in May 1863. Company B remained for six months, but Company I remained until March 1865, when it was relieved by Company C, 7th California Infantry Regiment, until 1866 when Camp Mohave was again garrisoned by regular U.S. Army troops. The U.S. Army remained until September 29, 1890, when the War Department turned it over to the Indian Service by order of President Benjamin Harrison. It was given up by the Indian Service in 1935 and is now part of the Fort Mojave Indian Reservation.

Geography

Fort Mohave is in western Mohave County along Arizona State Route 95. It is bordered to the north by Bullhead City, to the west by the Fort Mojave Indian Reservation, and to the south by unincorporated Mesquite Creek. AZ 95 leads north  to the center of Bullhead City and south  to Needles, California, across the Colorado River.

Many neighborhoods in Fort Mohave are built on man-made lakes, golf courses, and mesas with majestic mountain views. The newest golf course, Los Lagos Golf Club, is a Ted Robinson, Sr. Signature Golf Course.

It is home to the Mojave Crossing Event Center, the largest stadium within , serving all Mohave County for large indoor events. It has a seating capacity of 3,000 stadium style and 5,000 arena style.

Demographics

Fort Mohave is geographically between, and economically connected to, Bullhead City and Mohave Valley.

Economy

Fort Mohave has three large grocery stores, Smith's Food and Drug, Safeway, and a recently completed Wal-Mart Supercenter.  It also has a CVS Pharmacy and an ACE Hardware Store.  Restaurants include Great Dragon Chinese Cuisine, Bonanza Cafe, Casa Serrano Mexican Food, an ice cream parlor, and a McDonald's, along with several other fast food franchises.

Residents of Fort Mohave do the majority of their shopping and dining in Bullhead City, which is considered the shopping hub of the tri-state area.

Education
Fort Mohave has two public elementary schools, Fort Mojave Elementary School and Camp Mohave Elementary School, both of which are a part of the Mohave Valley Elementary School District.  There is also a public charter school, Young Scholar's Academy, All Beauty College, the Academy of Building Industries, and Desert Star.

Infrastructure

Health care
Fort Mohave is the location of the Valley View Medical Center, which opened in 2005. It is a  facility with state-of-the-art technology. The hospital features 38 medical/surgical beds, 10 rehabilitation beds, a six-bed labor and delivery unit, a six-bed intensive care unit, four major operating rooms and two procedure rooms. In 2010, Valley View announced a 1.2 million Emergency Room expansion.

Emergency services
Fort Mohave is served by the Fort Mojave-Mesa Fire Department.

Transportation
Vegas Airporter provides service between Lake Havasu City, Fort Mohave, and McCarran International Airport in Las Vegas.

See also
 Laughlin/Bullhead International Airport
 Laughlin, Nevada
 Mohave City, Arizona
 Oatman, Arizona

References

Arizona placenames of Native American origin
Lower Colorado River Valley
1935 establishments in Arizona